The following is a list of Teen Choice Award winners and nominees for Choice Music - Rock Song. It was first introduced as Choice Music - Rock Track in 2001 before being retitled in 2012. It was retitled to Choice Music - Rock/Alternative Song in 2018. Paramore receives the most wins with 4.

Winners and nominees

2000s

2010s

References

Rock music awards
Rock Song